Red Prophet (1988) is an alternate history/fantasy novel by American writer Orson Scott Card. It is the second book in Card's The Tales of Alvin Maker series and is about Alvin Miller, the seventh son of a seventh son. Red Prophet won the Locus Award for Best Fantasy Novel in 1989, was nominated for the Nebula Award for Best Novel in 1988, and the Hugo Award for Best Novel in 1989.

Setting
The book takes place in an alternate version of America where people have special abilities known as "knacks". The characters are caught up in a plot with ramifications on the entire future of America involving alternate versions of Tenskwa-Tawa (the "prophet"), Ta-Kumsaw, William Henry Harrison, and even Napoleon and La Fayette.

Plot summary
Lolla-Wossiky, a troubled, one-eyed, whiskey drinking "Red", leaves General Harrison's fort and heads north in order to find his "dream beast", the spirit that can save him from the pain of his memories. On his journey, he meets Alvin Miller Jr. and assists him in making an ethical decision that will shape his life forever. In appreciation, Alvin heals Lolla-Wossiky's painful memories, allowing him to give up alcohol and become in touch with the land once again. Lolla-Wossiky grows into "the Prophet" although he prefers to be known as Tenskwa-Tawa. Lolla-Wossiky preaches both pacifism and separatism, believing that "Reds" should live west of the Mississippi and "Whites" should live east of it.

Meanwhile, Lolla-Wossiky's brother, Ta-Kumsaw, tries to rally "Reds" behind his belief that their land should be defended violently. When Alvin Miller Jr. and his older brother Measure travel to the place of his birth (where Alvin is expected to become apprenticed to the Hatrack River blacksmith) the two brothers are captured by 'Reds' (Native Americans) sent by William Henry Harrison to intentionally create conflict. Ta-Kumsaw, sent by Lolla-Wossiky, rescues the brothers from torture and death. Measure leaves the "Reds" only to be captured by William Henry Harrison's men and subsequently beaten to the brink of death. Ta-Kumsaw accompanies Alvin to the holy site of Eight-Face Mound where they meet up with Taleswapper, an old friend of Alvin. Using the spiritual powers of the Eight-Face Mound, Alvin is able to heal Measure from afar. Measure is then able to stop some of the slaughter of Lolla-Wossiky's followers by villagers and William Henry Harrison's men over the alleged kidnapping and murder of Alvin and Measure Miller.

Adaptation
A twelve-part comic book version of the novel was printed by Marvel's Dabel Brothers Productions imprint. One of the issues of the comic series featured on its cover a copy of the painting Engaging the Shawnee Village  by John Buxton, which had been commissioned by the Heritage Center of Clark County, Ohio.

Characters 
 
Ta-Kumsaw
Tenskwa-Tawa - known as the prophet, Tenskwa-Tawa used his "inner eye" to predict the future and help shape events to meet his predictions.
William Henry Harrison
Napoleon Bonaparte - Has as knack for getting his soldiers to be insanely loyal and willing to die for him.
La Fayette
Andrew "Hickory" Jackson

See also

 List of works by Orson Scott Card

References

External links

About the novel Red Prophet from Card's website
Red Prophet at Worlds Without End

1988 American novels
The Tales of Alvin Maker series novels
American fantasy novels
American alternate history novels
1988 fantasy novels
Tor Books books